Saúl Edólver Ubaldini (December 29, 1936 – November 19, 2006) was an Argentine labor leader and parliamentarian for the Peronist Justicialist Party.

Ubaldini was born in the Buenos Aires barrio of Mataderos, the son of a meat worker and a seamstress. He worked in the processing plants and became involved in the trade union. In 1969 he started work at a small yeast factory and seven years later he was elected the Secretary-General of the small union of beer-industry workers. During the Proceso dictatorship, he was elected general secretary of the CGT, the trade union umbrella body, in 1979. In the years that followed, he led the "Brasil" fraction of the CGT, which showed a harder line against the military than its "CGT Azopardo"  counterpart. He led a march of 10,000 protesters against the dictatorship in 1981, the first large protest of that period.

When democracy returned, he became leader of the CGT in 1986. From this position he launched 13 general strikes against Radical Raúl Alfonsín's government. However, the CGT's combativeness subsided once Peronism was back in power. In 1989 Ubaldini was displaced as head of the CGT by supporters of President Carlos Menem. Although he had backed Menem's election campaign publicly, Ubaldini opposed Menem's free market reforms and refused to vacate the CGT building.

In 1993, Ubaldini stood to be Governor of Buenos Aires Province, heavily defeated by the Menemist Eduardo Duhalde. He was elected in 1997 and again in 2001 as a national deputy for Buenos Aires Province. In his last role he assisted the Planning Minister Julio de Vido. He had also been vice president of the international trade union movement CIOSL (now known as Trade Union Confederation of the Americas).

He died of lung cancer, aged 69, in Buenos Aires.

References

External links

1936 births
2006 deaths
Members of the General Confederation of Labour (Argentina)
Argentine activists
Members of the Argentine Chamber of Deputies elected in Buenos Aires Province
Justicialist Party politicians
Argentine people of Italian descent
People from Buenos Aires
Deaths from lung cancer in Argentina
Burials at La Chacarita Cemetery